Emperor Leo may refer to:
Leo I (emperor) (401–474), Byzantine emperor and Eastern Orthodox saint
Leo II (emperor) (467–474), Byzantine emperor
Leo III the Isaurian (c. 685–741), Byzantine emperor
Leo IV the Khazar (750–780), Byzantine emperor
Leo V the Armenian (775–820), Byzantine emperor
Leo VI the Wise (866–912), Byzantine emperor